Limatola is a comune (municipality) in the Province of Benevento in the Italian region Campania, located about 35 km northeast of Naples and about 30 km west of Benevento.

Limatola borders the following municipalities: Caiazzo, Caserta, Castel Campagnano, Castel Morrone, Dugenta, Piana di Monte Verna, Sant'Agata de' Goti.

References

Cities and towns in Campania